World of Ptavvs is a science fiction novel by American writer Larry Niven, first published in 1966 and set in his Known Space universe. It was Niven's first published novel and is based on a 1965 magazine story of the same name.

Plot summary

A reflective statue is found at the bottom of one of Earth's oceans, having lain there for 1.5 billion years. Since humans have recently developed a time-slowing field and found that one such field cannot function within another, it is suspected that the "Sea Statue" is actually a space traveler within one of these time fields. Larry Greenberg, a telepath, agrees to participate in an experiment: a time-slowing field is generated around both Greenberg and the statue, shutting off the stasis field and revealing Kzanol. Kzanol is a living Thrint, a member of a not particularly bright telepathic race that once ruled the galaxy through their enslavement of more intelligent species with their Power (mind control).

Eons ago, Kzanol's spaceship had suffered a catastrophic failure; its reactive drive system failed and the navigation computer automatically jettisoned it. Faced with insufficient power to use hyperspace, Kzanol aimed his ship at the nearest uninhabited Thrint planet used to grow yeast for food (Earth), and turned his spacesuit's emergency stasis field on to survive the long journey and impact. He also arranged for his ship to change course for the system's eighth planet (Neptune) after he was in stasis, with his amplifier helmet and other valuables stashed inside his spare suit (in order to hide these valuables from any rescuers).

Although he assumed that the resident Thrint overseer would be able to rescue him after seeing the plume of gas created by his impact, his timing could not have been worse; while he was in stasis, the races enslaved by the Thrint revolted. Facing extinction, the Thrint decided to take their enemies with them by constructing a telepathic amplifier powerful enough to command all sentient species in the galaxy to commit suicide. (Only the artificially created Bandersnatchi survived, having been secretly designed by their creators, the Tnuctipun, to be resistant to the Power.) After hundreds of millions of years, the yeast food mutated and evolved into complex life on Earth.

The telepathic encounter with the Thrint leaves the confused Greenberg with two sets of memories, his own and Kzanol's. He instinctively assumes he was Kzanol, the much more powerful telepath. Both Greenberg and the real Kzanol steal spaceships and race to reclaim the thought-amplifying machine on Neptune, which is powerful enough to enable a single Thrint to control every thinking being in the Solar System. The chase leads to Pluto, which had been a moon of Neptune before it was knocked into its own orbit by the impact of Kzanol's ship. Eventually, Greenberg's personality reasserts itself and, armed with the knowledge of how to resist the Power (from Kzanol's own memories), Greenberg traps Kzanol again in a stasis field.

A major element of the story is the tension between Earth and the "Belters", which threatens to burst into a highly destructive war over control of the telepathic amplifier. The mutually accepted compromise is to drop the spacesuit containing the dangerous device, still in a stasis field, onto Jupiter, where no one can recover it.

Reception
Algis Budrys described World of Ptavvs as "snappy, ingenious, and upbeat", praising Niven for "treat[ing] telepathy as the phenomenon it should logically be". Alan Brink noted that "Niven has made a very effective use of a teaser. A person who had not read the book has no way of knowing who or what 'Ptavvs' are; then you read it and find that we are ourselves Ptavvs and that Earth is the World of Ptavvs—as seen through alien eyes. The success of this book testifies to the effectiveness of Niven's curiosity-arousing device". (A Ptavv is a Thrint who lacks telepathic powers. Thrintun considered it a matter of great shame to have a Ptavv in their family and usually tattooed them pink to sell them as slaves.)

Charles Stross was inspired by the Thrintun/Tnuctipun relationship from World of Ptavvs when developing the relationship between the githyanki and illithids for Advanced Dungeons & Dragons. He also believed the illithids to have been originally inspired by the Thrintun.

According to Niven's recollection, Alexei Panshin wrote a "savage" review of Ptavvs for a fanzine and later cited it as a textbook example of how not to write a novel.  Panshin, however, denied that he cited Ptavvs outside of the initial review.

With regard to the book's ending, Silvia Parks-Brown noted: "Human nature and the way states and their military arms think and act are not said by Niven to have significantly changed in the time separating us from the Known Space series. That being so, it can be assumed with a high probability that in the decades after the ending of "Ptavvs", Earth and the Belt would be watching each other for any sign of the other developing the ability to enter the atmosphere of a gas giant, locate and recover objects from there, i.e. gain possession of the ditched Amplifier. Any sign that the other might have gained such a capacity would lead to tensions, threats of war or an actual "preemptive" war. Also, once having become aware that a Telepathic Amplifier is possible, both sides would start secret projects aimed at developing it for themselves—this arms race, too, carrying the risk of an all-out war".

Connections to other Niven works
Larry Greenberg volunteers to emigrate with his wife to Jinx to help the colonists communicate with the Bandersnatchi. Knowing the Tnuctipun writing system, he is able to read a message a Bandersnatchi writes, thus demonstrating that they are sentient.

The Thrintun are also mentioned in the Known Space story "The Handicapped".

Later on in the "Known Space" novel "Protector", Protagonist Elroy Truesdale observes The Sea Statue whilst visiting the "Smithsonian Institution".
"It looked the product of some advanced civilization...and it was; it was a pressure suit with emergency stasis field facilities, and the thing inside was very dangerous. Once it had gotten loose." - "Protector" by Larry Niven, 1973

Similar themes by other writers 
The theme of a human telepath "absorbing" the mind of an alien and thereby gaining various abilities and pieces of information was also at the center of Clifford Simak's Time Is the Simplest Thing.

The theme of a telepathic being able to enslave and control humans, and who comes back to malevolent active life in present-day Earth after an enormous time spent in hibernation or stasis, was used by John Brunner in The Atlantic Abomination.

References

1966 American novels
1966 science fiction novels
American science fiction novels
Ballantine Books books
Debut science fiction novels
Known Space stories
Novels about telepathy
Novels by Larry Niven
Novels set in the future
1966 debut novels